Speaking in Tongues is the fifth studio album by American rock band Talking Heads, released on June 1, 1983, by Sire Records. After their split with producer Brian Eno and a short hiatus, which allowed the individual members to pursue side projects, recording began in 1982. It became the band's commercial breakthrough and produced the band's sole US top-ten hit, "Burning Down the House".

The album's tour was documented in Jonathan Demme's 1984 film Stop Making Sense, which generated a live album of the same name. The album also crossed over to the dance charts, where it peaked at number two for six weeks. It is the group's highest-charting album on the US Billboard 200, peaking at number 15. It was also their biggest-selling album in Canada, where it was certified platinum in 1983.

Artwork
Talking Heads frontman David Byrne designed the cover for the general release of the album. Artist Robert Rauschenberg won a Grammy Award for his work on the limited-edition LP version, which featured a clear vinyl disc in clear plastic packaging along with three clear plastic discs printed with similar collages in three different colors.

Byrne has said, as a partial explanation of the album's title, "I originally sang nonsense, and ... made words to fit that. That worked out all right."

Release
Original cassette and later CD copies of the album have "extended versions" of "Making Flippy Floppy", "Girlfriend Is Better", "Slippery People", "I Get Wild/Wild Gravity" and "Moon Rocks". The album was re-released in February 2006 as a remastered DualDisc. It contains the extended versions of the songs found on the original cassette, and includes two additional tracks ("Two Note Swivel" and an alternate mix of "Burning Down the House"). The DVD-A side includes both stereo and 5.1 surround high resolution (96 kHz/24bit) mixes, as well as a Dolby Digital 5.1 version of the album, a new alternate version of "Burning Down the House", and videos for "Burning Down the House" and "This Must Be the Place" (videos are two-channel Dolby Digital only). In Europe it was released as a CD+DVDA two-disc set, rather than a single DualDisc. The reissue was produced by Andy Zax with Talking Heads.

In 2021, Rhino Entertainment re-released the album on sky blue vinyl.

Critical reception

Rolling Stones David Fricke lauded the album's crossover nature, calling it "the album that finally obliterates the thin line separating arty white pop music and deep black funk." He elaborated that the songs are all true art rock yet avoid the genre's common pretensions with a laid-back attitude and compelling dance rhythms, making it an ideal party album. For The Village Voice, critic Robert Christgau described the album as "quirkily comfortable," opining that without Brian Eno the band's rhythms sounded less portentous but also less meaningful. He added that "the disjoint opacity of the lyrics fails to conceal Byrne's confusion about what it all means," but praised the second side of the LP.

In a retrospective review for AllMusic, William Ruhlmann said that the album saw the band "open up the dense textures of the music they had developed with Brian Eno", and that they were "rewarded with their most popular album yet." He felt the additional musicians made the sound "more spacious, and the music admitted aspects of gospel," particularly on "Slippery People" and "Swamp". He noted Byrne's "impressionistic, nonlinear lyrics" and lauded the return of his "charming goofiness", calling the music "unusually light and bouncy." 

In his book on funk music, Rickey Vincent describes Speaking in Tongues as "deeply thumping funk disguised as modern rock."

Legacy
In 1989, Speaking in Tongues was ranked number 54 on Rolling Stones list of the 100 best albums of the 1980s. In 2012, Slant Magazine listed it as the 89th best album of the 1980s.

"Burning Down the House" was later covered by Welsh singer Tom Jones with the Cardigans, on his album Reload, reaching number 7 in the UK Charts. It has also been covered by screamo band the Used, pop rock band Walk the Moon, blues singer Bonnie Raitt and R&B singer John Legend. The song has also appeared in the movies Nymphomaniac, 13 Going on 30, and the TV series The Walking Dead.

"This Must Be the Place (Naive Melody)" has been covered by artists such as folk musicians the Lumineers and Iron & Wine, and indie rock band Arcade Fire. The song was also featured in the movies Wall Street and its sequel, Wall Street: Money Never Sleeps, Crazy, Stupid, Love., He's Just Not That Into You, Lars and the Real Girl, and the TV shows Little Fires Everywhere and Agents of S.H.I.E.L.D..

"Swamp" appears in the movies Risky Business, The King of Comedy and The Simpsons episode 3 Scenes Plus a Tag from a Marriage. "Girlfriend Is Better" appeared in an episode of the TV series Entourage. "Slippery People" appeared in the movie American Made and the TV series The Americans.

In 2022, the song "Burning Down the House" was used as a sample in the song "Keep It Burning" from Donda 2 by Kanye West, featuring a performance by rapper Future. The song was removed from the album after a day and was released later that year on Future's album I Never Liked You, under the same name, but without the sample.

Track listing

LP/early CD version

Cassette/later CD versions

2006 DualDisc reissue bonus tracks

Personnel 
Talking Heads
David Byrne – vocals, guitars, keyboards, synthesizers, bass guitar, percussion
Jerry Harrison – keyboards, synthesizers, guitars, backing vocals
Tina Weymouth – bass guitar, backing vocals, synthesizer, guitar 
Chris Frantz – drums, backing vocals, synthesizer

Additional musicians
Wally Badarou – synthesizers (1, 6, 9)
Bernie Worrell – synthesizers (3)
Alex Weir – guitar (2, 6, 7, 8)
Steve Scales – percussion (1, 7)
Raphael Dejesus – percussion (4, 5, 8)
David Van Tieghem – percussion (5, 9)
L. Shankar – double violin (2)
Richard Landry – saxophone (4)
Nona Hendryx – backing vocals (4)
Dolette McDonald – backing vocals (4)

Technical
Talking Heads – producers
Butch Jones – recording
John Convertino – recording assistant
Alex Sadkin – overdubbing, mixing
Frank Gibson – overdubbing assistant, mix assistant 
Jay Mark – overdubbing assistant, mix assistant 
Ted Jensen – mastering at Sterling Sound (New York City, New York)
Brian Kehew – 2006 Dual Disc bonus mixes
Robert Rauschenberg – limited edition cover art
David Byrne – original cover design

Charts

Weekly charts

Year-end charts

Certifications

References

1983 albums
Albums produced by David Byrne
Albums produced by Chris Frantz
Albums produced by Jerry Harrison
Albums produced by Tina Weymouth
Sire Records albums
Talking Heads albums